, stylized as gekidan INU CURRY, is an animation troupe consisting of ex-Gainax animator  under the name  and ex-TANTO 2D painter  under the name . They are known for their production design works in the Puella Magi Madoka Magica series, as well as creating the ending credits sequence for Maria Holic and Usagi Drop. They also regularly contribute illustrations to Maaya Sakamoto's Manpukuron column in Newtype Magazine.  Doroinu directed and wrote the Magia Record: Puella Magi Madoka Magica Side Story anime, which began airing in January 2020.

Artistic style
Doroinu and 2shiroinu of Gekidan Inu Curry describe their works as inspired by both  Russian and Czech animation styles. They expressed a preference in creating miniature landscapes that could be made by individuals instead of with working with many people "like in an orchestra".

In an interview with Maaya Sakamoto and Gekidan Inu Curry, Sakamoto described the characters used in her music video Universe, the sixth song in her album 30minutes night flight as "really colorful, cute and fantastical". Gekidan Inu Curry made the characters used in the song under Production I.G's Studio 4. However, Sakamoto noted that the characters show a "fancy atmosphere at first sight, but if you look at them carefully, you can see them injected with a needle, bandaged, or drooling." She added that the characters were "not only cute, but they also represent human imperfection." She also said that she held an "impression each character had a story behind him or her" and thought that "they were ideal actors to appear on the video".

Sakamoto described the colored drawings presented to her as having a "quality of a picture book and the unrealistic feel of a fairytale as well as a dark aspect to it".

In a review of Puella Magi Madoka Magica: The Movie by Geoff Berkshire of Variety described the "nightmare" characters of the film "surreal beings resembling paper-cutout collages inspired by classical Russian and Czech animation" and said as reminiscent of Terry Gilliam’s animated interludes for Monty Python.

References

External links
Official Blog 

Japanese animators
Anime character designers
Stop motion animators
Puella Magi Madoka Magica